Middlesex Community College (Middlesex and MxCC) is a public community college in Middletown, Connecticut. It is part of the Connecticut State Colleges & Universities system (CSCU).

The college has an open admissions policy. MxCC has about 4,400 full- and part-time students enrolled. It is a commuter school with no dormitories. MxCC offers associate degrees, certificates, and specialist programs.

History 
Middlesex Community College was founded in 1966 as a branch campus of Manchester Community College. MxCC became an independent community college in 1968. Initially the college operated in space rented from the Middletown Public School district and loaned by the Connecticut Valley Hospital. In 1973 the college moved to its present  campus overlooking the Connecticut River valley in Middletown.

Over the years, numerous signature programs were established such as precision manufacturing, business and industry, new media production, and early childhood education.

In 2022, following a request for substantive change from the CSCU system, it was announced that all of the community-technical colleges in Connecticut will consolidate into one institution, named CT State Community College. MxCC is committed to continuing its signature programs and initiatives following the merger.

Campus 
Middlesex Community College has three distinct locations and offers courses at a variety of locations across Middlesex County.

Main Campus (Middletown) 
The college's main campus is in Middletown at 100 Training Hill Road (approximately a mile and a half from the center of Middletown) and 
includes four main buildings: Snow, Wheaton, Founder's, and Chapman Hall. The buildings are air conditioned and accessible. The campus is located on a scenic hillside overlooking the Connecticut River valley, about a mile and a half from the center of Middletown.

The campus features general purpose classrooms, computer classrooms, arts and media studios, and special purpose laboratories. Faculty and administrative offices, a cafeteria, bookstore, and multipurpose halls are also featured.

New facilities such as the Pavilion, deck, solar patio, as well as the collaborative Learning Commons space offer a variety of places for students to study, socialize, and participate in activities.

In addition to ample free student parking, a municipal bus route stops at the campus twice hourly.

MxCC at Platt 
In 2004, Middlesex opened a new learning site at 55 West Main Street, in Meriden, Connecticut. Students can enroll in credit, credit-free, day, evening, and weekend courses at the MxCC Meriden Center. Greater Meriden-Wallingford area business and industry can take advantage of education and training through Meriden's Internet Training Center.

In 2012, the Meriden Center was recognized by the New England Association of Schools and Colleges as an "additional instructional location". With this new recognition, students can now complete a degree or certificate program at the Meriden Center. Prior to this, students could only complete fifty percent or less of a degree program at the center before finishing their degree at the Middletown campus.

Following the renovation of Orville H. Platt High School, the leaders of MxCC and the Meriden Public School System started offering courses at the new location. Student support services, access to the Magic Food Bus, and other unique amenities are available to students at both campuses.

Shoreline 
Credit and non-credit courses are also offered in Old Saybrook and Clinton. In Old Saybrook the high school at 1111 Boston Post Road is often used to hold classes.

Student life 
The Beta Gamma Xi chapter of the Phi Theta Kappa (the academic honor society for two-year colleges) is active at MxCC. Active clubs on campus include the Human Services Student Association (HSSA), Students Promoting Equality, Acceptance and Knowledge (S.P.E.A.K.), the Computer Club, and the Math Club. There is also an active student government body, the MxCC Student Senate.
In 2013, MxCC was the first community college to offer a chapter of Mu Alpha Theta, a math honor society.

Middlesex also operates a low power radio station, Hacker Airwaves FM 87.7, under a local marketing agreement. As a component of the Center for New Media, the partnership provides students with the opportunity to create original audio programming, to learn about the hands-on skills and requirements of running a college radio station, and to organize student activities related to radio, podcasting, and audio media. Student producers have had great success broadcasting music from the 60s, 70s, and 80s, local high school sports, and other noncommercial programming.

References

External links 
Official website
Hacker Airwaves FM 87.7

Community colleges in Connecticut
Buildings and structures in Middletown, Connecticut
Educational institutions established in 1966
Universities and colleges in Middlesex County, Connecticut
1966 establishments in Connecticut